Artem Koleda is a retired Ukrainian footballer who played as a goalkeeper. He is currently the goalkeeper coach at Zirka Kropyvnytskyi.

Career
Koleda began his career at Dnipro Cherkasy in 1999. In 2001 he signed with Krystal Kherson, beginning a career jumping around a handful of lower-level teams in Ukraine, including several stints at Desna Chernihiv. He finally ended his playing career in 2012 with Zirka Kropyvnytskyi.

After Retirement
In June 2012 he became the goalkeeping coach of Zirka Kropyvnytskyi.

Honours
FC Arsenal-Kyivshchyna Bila Tserkva
 Ukrainian Second League: Runner-Up 2008–09

Desna Chenrihiv
 Ukrainian Second League: Runner-Up 2003–04

References

External links
 Artem Koleda at upl.ua 
 Artem Koleda at pfl.ua 
 

 

1981 births
Living people
Soviet footballers
Footballers from Chernihiv
FC Desna Chernihiv players
FC Zirka Kropyvnytskyi players
FC Dnipro Cherkasy players
FC Krystal Kherson players
FC Hirnyk-Sport Horishni Plavni players
FC Arsenal-Kyivshchyna Bila Tserkva players
Ukrainian footballers
Association football goalkeepers